Full of Fire is the 10th studio album by soul singer Al Green, released in 1976.

Track listing
Side one
 "Glory, Glory" (Al Green, Willie Mitchell) - 2:51
 "That's the Way It Is" (Al Green) - 3:44
 "Always" (Al Green, Charles Hodges) - 3:23
 "There's No Way" (Willie Mitchell, Earl Randle) - 3:34
 "I'd Fly Away" (Al Green) - 4:14

Side two
 "Full of Fire" (Al Green, Willie Mitchell, Mabon "Teenie" Hodges) - 5:15
 "Together Again" (Buck Owens) - 5:18
 "Soon as I Get Home" (Al Green, Michael Allen) - 3:28
 "Let It Shine" (Al Green, Mabon "Teenie" Hodges) - 3:16

Personnel
Al Green - vocals
Teenie Hodges - guitar
Leroy Hodges - bass
Charles Hodges - organ
Howard Grimes - drums, congas
Archie Turner, Michael Allen - piano
Charles Chalmers, Donna Rhodes, Sandra Rhodes - backing vocals
Andrew Love, Lewis Collins - tenor saxophone
James Mitchell - baritone saxophone
Jack Hale, Jr - trumpet 
Wayne Jackson - trumpet
Jack Hale - trombone
The Memphis Strings - strings
Norman Seeff - photography

References 

Al Green albums
1976 albums
Albums produced by Willie Mitchell (musician)
The Right Stuff Records albums